The Chorote languages form a small group of indigenous language varieties spoken primarily in northwestern Argentina, and also in Paraguay and far-southeastern Bolivia. The languages are part of the Matacoan family, and are most closely related to Wichí. They are also known as Chorotí, Yofúaha, or Tsoloti.

Languages
Gordon (2005) in Ethnologue divides Chorote into the following two languages.

Iyo’wujwa Chorote or Manhui (also known as Manjuy)
Iyojwa’ja Chorote or Eklenhui (also known as Eclenjuy, Eklehui, Chorote, Choroti)

References

Languages of Argentina
Languages of Bolivia
Languages of Paraguay
Matacoan languages
Chaco linguistic area